In England the Bathing Water Regulations 2013 is a statutory instrument defining water suitable for bathing (in the sense of recreational swimming and paddling), other than swimming pools and similar places. An annual list of bathing places is produced. The water must pass water quality standards set by the Environment Agency.

In December 2020 it was announced that a stretch of the River Wharfe at Ilkley in West Yorkshire would become the first river bathing place to be added to the list, which hitherto included coastal sites and lakes.

References

Swimming venues in England
Statutory Instruments of the United Kingdom